Super Rabbit is a fictional, talking animal superhero in comic books published by Timely Comics, a predecessor of Marvel Comics, during the 1930s and 1940s period fans and historians call the Golden Age of comic books. Created by cartoonist Ernie Hart, he first appeared in Comedy Comics #14 (cover-dated Mar. 1943).

The character appeared after Fawcett Comics' talking-animal superhero Hoppy the Marvel Bunny (debut: Fawcett's Funny Animals #1, cover-dated Dec. 1942), and before the Bugs Bunny theatrical cartoon short "Super-Rabbit" (released in April 1943).

Publication history
Following his debut as the cover star of Comedy Comics #14 (March 1943), Super Rabbit remained the lead feature through #33 (Sept. 1946). A star of Timely Comics' humor division — produced by what the company called its "animator bullpen", edited by Vincent Fago and largely separate from the superhero group producing comics featuring Captain America and other such characters — Super Rabbit also appeared in Krazy Comics, Comic Capers, Funny Tunes (a.k.a. Animated Funny Comic-Tunes), All Surprise Comics (as the cover star of #1-11, Fall 1943 - Fall 1946) and other anthology series.

He additionally starred in his own Super Rabbit Comics, which ran 14 issues (Fall 1944 - Nov. 1948). His final story appeared in It's a Duck's Life #11 (Feb. 1952).

While a series of authorized reprints of Super Rabbit's adventures was published in Canada by Bell Features, three known unauthorized reprint issues appeared from Israel Waldman's I.W. Publishing beginning in 1958, with issues #1-2 released that year. A third issue, labeled #7 and costing 10¢, later appeared, and was reissued in 1963 as #10 and costing 12¢.

Aside from creator Ernie Hart, other artists who contributed to his adventures included Mike Sekowsky, Al Jaffee, and inker Violet Barclay.

In 1977, Marvel announced a reboot of the character in a solo series with Marv Wolfman as writer, but apparently this project did not come to fruition.

Fictional character biography
Meek little Waffles Bunny, variously depicted as a reporter or a shoeshine boy, rubs a magic ring to gain mass and height and become the flying, super-strong Super Rabbit. He is virtually invulnerable except for a small spot on the very top of his head, where something as light as a falling feather could knock him out. He protects the innocent, captures robbers, and even fights such World War II menaces as Super Nazi, a pig with a Hitler mustache. His self-proclaimed "number-one fan" and unasked-for publicist Wilbur Woodpecker occasionally accompanies Super Rabbit, much to his consternation.

Generally tall and lanky, the blue-clad, red-caped and orange-gloved and booted "Marvel of the Age" sometimes takes on a more buff and bulky form. His original costume featured the initial "S" on his chest, which he later replaced with the words "SUPER RABBIT".

In other media
A rabbit named Waffles appeared in the animated series M.O.D.O.K., which was intended to be a reference to Super Rabbit, whose real name is Waffles.

References

External links
 Nevins, Jess. "The Timely Comics Story", p. 5. WebCitation archive.
  
 
 Ernie Hart at the Lambiek Comiclopedia. Archived November 3, 2011

Marvel Comics superheroes
Fictional rabbits and hares
Fictional anthropomorphic characters
Golden Age superheroes
Golden Age comics titles
Timely Comics characters
1943 comics debuts
1952 comics endings
Comics characters introduced in 1943
Superhero comics
Comics about animals
Comics about rabbits and hares
Marvel Comics characters who are shapeshifters
Marvel Comics characters who use magic
Marvel Comics characters with superhuman strength
Marvel Comics male superheroes
Fictional reporters
Anthropomorphic rabbits and hares